, also titled Woman's All About the Looks, is a Japanese manga series by . It's All About the Looks was serialized in the  manga magazine Be Love from December 14, 2013 to June 1, 2017. A live-action television drama adaptation was broadcast from April 13 to June 15, 2017.

Plot

Jonouchi, Sato, and Maeda are three scientists who work as researchers at a paper company. Having been out of touch with fashion, the three women form the research group JSM (an acronym of their names) to study and try out modern fashion trends with varying degrees of success.

Characters

Jonouchi a 30-year-old woman. She is described as a plain-looking woman who has never dated in her life.

Maeda is a 40-year-old woman with an outdated fashion sense.

Sato is a 25-year-old woman who researches fashion to understand why she is unpopular, in spite of people of her body type being able to be fashionable. However, she would rather spend money on delicious food instead of clothes.

Media

Manga

It is serialized in the  manga magazine Be Love from December 14, 2013 (2014 issue no. 1) to June 1, 2017 (2017 issue no. 12). The chapters were later released in five bound volumes by Kodansha under the Be Love KCDX imprint.

In addition to the manga's serialization in Be Love, Okubo also drew a short comic where the characters research skincare that was published in the September 2015 issue of the fashion magazine Voce.

Television drama

A live-action television series adaptation, re-imagined as a romantic comedy, was announced on January 25, 2017, and ran from April 13, 2017 to June 15, 2017 on Fuji TV at 10 PM. The drama starred Mirei Kiritani as Jonouchi. Asami Mizukawa was cast as Maeda in February 2017, followed by Chiemi Blouson in March 2017 in her acting debut. Kiritani and Mizukawa stated in an interview with Fuji TV that they were excited to play characters with interests and backgrounds different from their own. Regarding Kiritani's casting, Hiromi Okubo, the original creator, tweeted that she was looking forward to seeing Kiritani wear a lab coat.

Series regulars, consisting of original characters created for the drama, include Rika Adachi as Kasumi Kishine,  as Miyu Morimura, Atsushi Tsutsumishita from the comedy duo  as Motoki Misawa, Ryo Narita as a beautician, and  member Keita Machida as Takuma Maruo. The theme song is "Joshi Modoki" by JY.

The scene of Jonouchi walking down a runway was filmed at the Tokyo Girls Collection 2017 Spring/Summer show. To promote the television drama, Blouson performed her "career woman" comedy routine with Narita and Machida at the same event, with Narita and Machida taking place of the comedy duo  (who had performed as her backing group for the routine). The members of Brillian also make a cameo appearance in the drama.

References

External links 

  

2017 Japanese television series debuts
Japanese television dramas based on manga
Josei manga
Kodansha manga
Comedy anime and manga